Glasgow Govan by-election or Govan by-election may refer to:
1889 Govan by-election, won by John Wilson of the Liberal Party
1973 Glasgow Govan by-election, won by Margo MacDonald of the Scottish National Party (SNP)
1988 Glasgow Govan by-election, won by Jim Sillars of the Scottish National Party (SNP)